Astor was an unincorporated community in Crawford County, in the U.S. state of Iowa.

History

Astor was platted on the Chicago, Milwaukee, and St Paul Railroad in 1882 by Alexander Liedlum. Astor had a Methodist church, a school, a grain elevator, and a general store which also served as the post office. The town grew quickly, but railroad officials set the junction of the rail line two miles northeast, to nearby Manilla. Many residents in Astor then moved their houses to Manilla, pulling them on horse-drawn skids. The community was slowly abandoned. 

The community's population was 150 in 1890, 22 in 1900, and 42 in 1920.

References

Unincorporated communities in Crawford County, Iowa
Unincorporated communities in Iowa